Leaman may refer to:

Leaman (surname)
Leaman, Alberta, also known as Yellowhead County, Alberta, a municipal district in west central Alberta, Canada
Leaman Place, Pennsylvania, a named place in Lancaster County, Pennsylvania, United States

See also

Aleman (disambiguation)
Alleman (disambiguation)
Allemann
Laaman
Lahman
Lahmann
Laiman
Lamane
Lamian
Lanman (disambiguation)
Laomian (disambiguation)
Lawman (disambiguation)
Layman
Laḥman
Lee Man
Leeman (disambiguation)
Lehman (disambiguation)
Lehmann
Lei Man
Lemann
Lineman (disambiguation)

de:Leaman